Angela is a 2002 Italian crime drama film  written and directed  by Roberta Torre.

It was screened in the Directors' Fortnight at the 55th Cannes Film Festival. For her performance in this film Donatella Finocchiaro won the Globo d'oro for best female newcomer.

Cast  
 Donatella Finocchiaro as  Angela 
 Andrea Di Stefano as  Masino 
 Mario Pupella as  Saro 
 Erasmo Lobello as  Mimmo 
 Matteo Gulino as  Paolino 
 Toni Gambino as  Santino 
 Giuseppe Pettinato as  Raffaele Santangelo
 Maria Mistretta as Minica
  as Commissioner

References

External links

Italian crime drama films
2002 crime drama films
2002 films
2000s Italian films